Gekko vertebralis is a species of gecko. It is endemic to the Ryukyu Islands. It was first described in 2008 by Toda, Sengoku, Hikida and Ota.

References

Gekko
Reptiles described in 2008
Endemic reptiles of Japan